Bob the Cucumber may refer to:

 Bob the Cucumber, a recurring character from Drawn Together
 The older brother of the VeggieTales character, Larry the Cucumber